Jakub Kraska (born 19 April 2000) is a Polish swimmer. He competed in the men's 4 × 100 metre freestyle relay event at the 2018 European Aquatics Championships, winning the bronze medal.

References

External links
 

2000 births
Living people
Place of birth missing (living people)
Polish male freestyle swimmers
European Aquatics Championships medalists in swimming
European Championships (multi-sport event) bronze medalists
Swimmers at the 2018 Summer Youth Olympics
Swimmers at the 2020 Summer Olympics
Olympic swimmers of Poland
21st-century Polish people